Mateo Gucci (c. 1500 – c. 1550) was a Polish-Italian Renaissance architect and sculptor.

He rebuilt the Old Synagogue in the Kraków suburb of Kazimierz, and he may have worked on the Wawel Castle. He is believed to have died in 1550, according to the town books of Kraków. He was the brother of Santi Gucci, who also worked as sculptor and architect in Poland.

References
 Polska na Weekend
 Zofia Wenzel-Homecka, Mateusz Gucci, w: Polski Słownik Biograficzny, tom IX, 1960-1961

Architects from Kraków
Italian Renaissance architects
Polish sculptors
Polish male sculptors
Italian sculptors
Italian male sculptors
Renaissance architects
Renaissance sculptors
Italian emigrants to Poland
Year of birth uncertain